Zdvinsk is a rural locality (a selo) and the administrative center of Zdvinsky District of Novosibirsk Oblast, Russia, located on the Kargat River. Population:  Postal code: 632950. Dialing code: +7 38363.

Geography
The landscape of Zdvisk is plain; there are some forests and steppe areas around.

History
It was founded in 1773 as a farmed plot of land called Taskayevo. It grew in size in the following years and in 1896 was renamed Nizhny Kargat. On June 7, 1933, it was given its present name, Zdvinsk, after a local revolutionary M. Zdvinsky who died in 1918. It was granted urban-type settlement status in 1978, but was demoted back to a rural locality in 1992.

Transportation
Zdvinsk does not have direct railway access or an airport. The main paved road connects it to Barabinsk, a major railway station.

Notable residents 

Aleksandr Stolyarenko (born 1991), footballer

References

Populated places established in 1773

Rural localities in Novosibirsk Oblast